Shion is a Japanese given name, and may refer to:

Sportspeople
, Japanese footballer
, Japanese footballer
, Japanese figure skater
, Japanese footballer

Musicians
, a R&B singer
, a pop singer
, a singer-songwriter
Shion Tsurubo (鶴房 汐恩, born 2000), Japanese idol, member of JO1

Other people
, Japanese filmmaker
Shion Takeuchi (born 1988), American television writer and creator of the Netflix series Inside Job
, Japanese voice actresses

Fictional characters

 Aries Shion, a character from the manga and anime Saint Seiya
 Shion Yorigami, a character from the Touhou series of games.
 Shion, one of the two main characters of the novel, manga, and anime No. 6.
 Shion, a hidden scenario character from the yaoi visual novel Enzai.
 Shion, a character from the manga and anime Nana
 Shion (Naruto), a character in Naruto Shippūden the Movie
 Shion (The King of Fighters), a sub-boss in The King of Fighters XI video game
 Shion (Wonder Boy), a Legendary Hero from the Genesis game Wonder Boy in Monster World
 Shion Kozakura, a character from the Kagerou Project.
 Shion Karanomori, a character from the anime series Psycho Pass.
 Shion Pavlichenko, a character from season 2 of the anime Darker than Black.
 Shion Sonozaki, a character from the Higurashi no Naku Koro ni video games, anime and manga
 Shion Uzuki, a character from Xenosaga video games
 Shion Yasuoka, the female protagonist of the manga and anime Shion no Ō
 Sion Eltnam Atlasia, one of the main characters from the Melty Blood graphic novel, video games, and manga
 Shion, a character of the novel, manga, and anime That Time I Got Reincarnated as a Slime.

Other uses
, an album by MUCC
The Japanese pronunciation of Zion

See also
Xion (disambiguation), which is pronounced Shion
Sion (disambiguation)
Zion (disambiguation)

References

Japanese unisex given names